The 2017 Indonesian Movie Actors Awards was the 11th annual Indonesian Movie Actors Awards show that was held at Plenary Hall INews Centre and organised by RCTI. With the theme Glamour of Indonesia this event was hosted by Daniel Mananta and Arie Untung. The event was attended by the CEO of MNC Group, Hary Tanoesoedibjo and the Chairman of the Indonesian Film Artists Association (PARFI) and the Indonesian Film and Television Employees (KFT), Febryan Adhitya.

In this awards show, the film Cek Toko Sebelah succeeded in becoming the Favorite Film of the Viewers' Choice. Meanwhile, Reza Rahadian won two trophies for the Best and the Favourite Actor category thanks to his role in the film My Stupid Boss. Bisma Karisma also won two awards for the Best and the Favourite Newcomer for his role in the film Juara.

Judges

Presenters 
 Daniel Mananta
 Arie Untung
 Robby Purba
 Ayushita

Performers 
 NOAH
 Gamaliel Audrey Cantika
 Ari Lasso
 Maudy Ayunda
 Sheryl Sheinafia
 Ario Bayu
 Lala Karmela
 Berlian Hutauruk

Winners and nominees

Best
Winners are listed first and highlighted in boldface.
{| class="wikitable"width="100%"
|-
! style="background:#EEDD82;" ! style="width="50%" | Best Actor
! style="background:#EEDD82;" ! style="width="50%" | Best Actress
|-
| valign="top" |
Reza Rahadian – My Stupid Boss
Abimana Aryasatya – Warkop DKI Reborn: Jangkrik Boss! Part 1
Teuku Rifnu Wikana – Aku Ingin Ibu Pulang
Chicco Jerikho – Surat Cinta Untuk Kartini
Nino Fernandez – Wa'alaikumussalam Paris
| valign="top" |
Cut Mini Theo – Athirah
Laudya Cynthia Bella – Aisyah: Biarkan Kami Bersaudara
Imelda Therinne – The Professionals
Lala Karmela – Bukaan 8
Nirina Zubir –  Aku Ingin Ibu Pulang
|-
! style="background:#EEDD82;" ! style="width="50%" | Best Supporting Actor
! style="background:#EEDD82;" ! style="width="50%" | Best Supporting Actress
|-
| valign="top" |
Agus Kuncoro – Moammar Emka's Jakarta Undercover
Dion Wiyoko–Cek Toko Sebelah'Baim Wong – Moammar Emka's Jakarta Undercover
Arie Kriting – Aisyah: Biarkan Kami Bersaudara
Alex Abbad –  My Stupid Boss
| valign="top" |Raihaanun – SalawakuChelsea Islan – 3 Srikandi
Lydia Kandou - Aisyah: Biarkan Kami Bersaudara
Ira Maya Sopha – Pinky Promise
Ira Wibowo – Sabtu Bersama Bapak
|-
! style="background:#EEDD82;" ! style="width="50%" | Best Newcomer Actor/Actress! style="background:#EEDD82;" ! style="width="50%" | Best Children Role|-
| valign="top" |Bisma Karisma – JuaraGiulio Parengkuan – Pertaruhan
Sheryl Sheinafia – Koala Kumal
Rania Putri Sari – Surat Cinta Untuk Kartini
Dhea Seto – Pinky Promise
| valign="top" |Adriyan Bima –  Bangkit!Dionisius Rivaldo Moruk – Aisyah: Biarkan Kami Bersaudara
Messi Gusti – Cinta Laki-laki Biasa
Elko Kastanya – Salawaku
Jefan Nathanio – Aku Ingin Ibu Pulang
|-
! style="background:#EEDD82;" ! style="width="50%" | Best Chemistry! style="background:#EEDD82;" ! style="width="50%" | Best Ensemble|-
| valign="top" |Dian Sastrowardoyo and Nicholas Saputra –  Ada Apa dengan Cinta? 2Lala Karmela and Chicco Jerikho – Bukaan 8
Velove Vexia and Nino Fernandez – Wa'alaikumussalam Paris
Cut Mini Theo and Irish Bella – Me vs Mami
Nirina Zubir and  Teuku Rifnu Wikana – Aku Ingin Ibu Pulang
| valign="top" |Falcon Pictures – My Stupid Boss''MP Pro – Pinky Promise
IFI Sinema – Pertaruhan
Demi Istri Production – Moammar Emka's Jakarta Undercover
Grafent Pictures – Moammar Emka's Jakarta Undercover
PT. Kharisma Starvision Plus – Cek Toko Sebelah
|}

Favourite
Winners are listed first and highlighted in boldface'''.

Lifetime Achievement 
The Lifetime Achievement award is given to the person who is considered the most dedicated to the world of Indonesian cinema that year. This year the award was given to a senior actress, Christine Hakim, for her dedication and totality in the Indonesian film industry.

See also 
 Festival Film Indonesia 2017
 Festival Film Bandung 2017
 Indonesian Box Office Movie Awards 2017
 Usmar Ismail Awards 2017

References

External links 
 

Indonesian
2017 in Indonesia
Indonesian Movie Actor Awards